Pisagua Department was a department in Tarapacá Province, Chile, from 1883 to 1974. It was ceded to Chile under the Treaty of Ancón, formerly being part of the Peruvian province of the same name.

History
The department was created on 31 October 1884 under the administration of the also new Tarapacá Province, both awarded to Chile under the Treaty of Ancón, along with Tacna. It was bordered to the north by the Arica Department, to the east by Bolivia, to the south by the Tarapacá Department (after 1928 the Iquique Department), and to the west by the Pacific Ocean.

See also
 War of the Pacific
 Treaty of Ancón
 Consequences of the War of the Pacific
 Chilenization of Tacna, Arica and Tarapacá
 Tacna Province (Chile)
 Litoral Department
 Arica Province (Peru)
 Tarapacá Department (Peru)
 Tarapacá Department (Chile)

Former departments of Chile